The Snøgg class was a Royal Norwegian Navy class of fast patrol boats (FPB). It might also be classified as a torpedo boat or a missile boat. In Norway this type of vessel is called a missile torpedo boat (MTB). The class was named after its lead vessel, Snøgg, which is a Norwegian word meaning "fast". All of the subsequent names are synonyms of "fast".

Six vessels were built during 1970 and 1971 to replace the ageing .

Vessels 
Listed here in order of delivery with their pennant numbers in RNoN service:
 HNoMS Snøgg (P980) (1970-1994)
 HNoMS Rapp (P981)
 HNoMS Snar (P982)
 HNoMS Rask (P983)
  (1970-1995)
 HNoMS Kjapp (P985)

Note: The Norwegian prefix for RNoN vessels is KNM.

Sources
 Information folder from Forsvarets rekrutterings- og mediesenter (Norwegian defence recruitment and media centre) 1991/92 
Royal Norwegian Navy history web page 

Missile boat classes
 
Torpedo boat classes